Goran Kalamiza (born February 5, 1974) is a retired Croatian professional basketball player. He played the point guard position.

External links
Profile at eurobasket.com
Profile at fibaeurope.com
Profile at turksports.net 

1974 births
Living people
Croatian men's basketball players
KK Cibona players
KK Split players
KK Zadar players
Fenerbahçe men's basketball players
Croatian expatriate basketball people in Turkey
MENT B.C. players
HKK Široki players
Asseco Gdynia players
Polonia Warszawa (basketball) players
KB Peja players
Riesen Ludwigsburg players
Point guards